The Inversiulidae is a family within the bryozoan order Cheilostomatida. Colonies are often encrusting sheets on shells or rocks. The zooids are characterised by having an operculum that opens in the opposite way to other cheilostome genera; i.e. the hinge is located at the 'top' (towards the growing edge) of the zooid.

References 

Cheilostomatida
Bryozoan families
Extant Oligocene first appearances